The Tablazo Formation is a Middle Pleistocene geologic formation of Santa Elena Province in western Ecuador. The claystones and sandstones were deposited in an estuarine environment.

Fossil content 
The formation has provided the following fossils:
 Geochelone sp.
 Eremotherium cf. laurillardi
 Notiomastodon platensis (described as Haplomastodon waringii)
 Smilodon fatalis

An association of two subadult and one adult specimen of Smilodon fatalis was reported from the formation by Reynolds, Seymour & Evans (2021), who interpret the subadult specimens as likely to be siblings, and evaluate the implications of this finding for the knowledge of the life history of S. fatalis.

See also 
 List of fossiliferous stratigraphic units in Ecuador

References

Bibliography 
  
 
 

Geologic formations of Ecuador
Pleistocene Ecuador
Lujanian
Shale formations
Sandstone formations
Tidal deposits
Paleontology in Ecuador
Formations